Lyubov Vafina (born 25 November 1967) is a Kazakh retired ice hockey player. She represented  in the women's ice hockey tournament at the 2002 Winter Olympics. Her daughter is Russian national team player Alexandra Vafina.

References

External links
 

1967 births
Living people
Kazakhstani women's ice hockey players
Olympic ice hockey players of Kazakhstan
Ice hockey players at the 2002 Winter Olympics
Sportspeople from Almaty
Asian Games medalists in ice hockey
Ice hockey players at the 1999 Asian Winter Games
Ice hockey players at the 2003 Asian Winter Games
Medalists at the 1999 Asian Winter Games
Medalists at the 2003 Asian Winter Games
Asian Games gold medalists for Kazakhstan
Asian Games bronze medalists for Kazakhstan